Kanyama is a settlement in Kenya's Central Province.

References

Populated places in Central Province (Kenya)